Béla Nagy Abodi (Hungarian: Abodi Nagy Béla; 13 July 1918 – 9 December 2012) was a Hungarian painter, and professor of the Academy of Fine Arts in Cluj-Napoca. He studied in the class of Camil Ressu at the Academia de Belle-Arte in Bucharest, and then went to the Hungarian Academy of Fine Arts in Budapest, as a student of István Szőnyi. He served for 5 years in the Hungarian army, and became a war prisoner in USSR. He worked as a teacher at the Academy of Fine Arts in Cluj-Napoca.

References 

Hungarian University of Fine Arts alumni
20th-century Hungarian painters
20th-century Hungarian male artists
21st-century Hungarian painters
21st-century Hungarian male artists
1918 births
2012 deaths
Hungarian male painters